Yalleroi is a rural town in the north of the locality of Blackall in the Blackall-Tambo Region, Queensland, Australia.

History 
The locality name is derived from pastoral run name and is an Aboriginal word, meaning stone/stony. The town of Yalleroi appears on a 1913 survey plan.

Yalleroi State School opened on 2 February 1933 and closed in 1983.

References

External links 
 

Towns in Queensland
Blackall-Tambo Region
Blackall, Queensland